Gjocaj is a village and a former municipality in the Elbasan County, central Albania. At the 2015 local government reform it became a subdivision of the municipality Peqin. The population at the 2011 census was 5,207. The municipal unit consists of the villages Gjocaj, Celhakaj, Hasmashaj, Kurtaj, Vashaj, Rrumbullak, Bregas, Bardhas and Blinas.

References

Former municipalities in Elbasan County
Administrative units of Peqin
Villages in Elbasan County